Albey Ahmed Berri is the Chief of Staff of the Free Syrian Army. Berri was appointed to the position of Chief of Staff in October 2014, taking over from Abdul-Ilah al-Bashir. In December 2014, he was replaced by Brigadier General Abdelkarim al-Ahmed. In July 2015, after a dispute with the Supreme Military Council, the Syrian National Coalition instructed Berri to return as head of the FSA General Staff. However, his position is not recognised by the Supreme Military Council.

Background

Syrian Civil War
Since 2012, Berri was commander of the infamous Hama Military Council. Free Syrian Army forces under its command committed the Aqrab massacre in December 2012, resulting in 125-300 civilians killed, most of them from the Alawite minority. On December 31, 2013, while on his way to Taftanaz, he was arrested with two of his soldiers at Islamic State of Iraq and the Levant's checkpoint and was put near Saraqeb, a city in northern Idlib. Following Idlib Military Council's push for his release and a demonstration of people in Maaret al-Numan, he was set free in Hama.

References

Living people
Syrian generals
Defectors to the Free Syrian Army
Year of birth missing (living people)
Place of birth missing (living people)